George Andrew Alexander (8 September 1884–1969) was a United States Navy Captain who served as the 35th Naval Governor of Guam. Prior to serving as governor, he commanded . As Governor of Guam, he greatly changed the judicial system by purging the island of leftover Spanish laws and replacing them with the Code of Guam. He also led an unsuccessful campaign to obtain United States citizenship for all residents of Guam. After his term as governor, he commanded  before retiring.

Early life 
Alexander grew up and lived most of his life in Ohio.

Education 
Alexander entered the United States Naval Academy from Ohio in 1902. He subsequently attended Naval War College.

Career 
In 1929, Alexander took command of the Naval Oceanographic Office in Seattle, Washington.

Following his post as governor, he commanded  from June 8, 1936, until December 11, 1937. Though the government of Guam recommended him for promotion to rear admiral, he retired from the Navy as a captain.

Governorship
Alexander served as the governor from June 21, 1933, to March 27, 1936. He supported the local effort to obtain United States citizenship for all residents of Guam, sending a petition requesting the right and signed by 2,000 Guamanians to the President of the United States. He revolutionized the Guam legal system, replacing old Spanish-style laws with the Code of Guam, a set of laws based on the California Codes. Though the Guam Museum opened in 1933, Alexander officially made it a government institution by executive order.

Personal life 
Alexander was married. They had two daughters, Lois and Lauramae. Alexander and his family have lived in places including Long Beach, California, and Guam.

Alexander's daughter is Lauramae Alexander Sholars (Mrs. Stanifer Sholars).

In October 1970, Alexander died in Baton Rouge, Louisiana. Alexander is interred at Vine Street Hill Cemetery in Cincinnati, Ohio.

References

External links 
 George Andrew Alexander at ourcampaigns.com
 Lois Bennett at Los Angeles Times, Nov 14, 1937, Page 72
 Alexanders Greet Grand-daughter at Los Angeles Times, Nov 25, 1937, Page 38

1884 births
1969 deaths
Military personnel from Ohio
United States Naval Academy alumni
Governors of Guam
United States Navy captains
Burials at Vine Street Hill Cemetery